Teng Wensheng (born October 1940) is a Chinese politician who served as director of the Central Policy Research Office from 1997 to 2002 and director of the  from 2002 to 2007. He was a member of the 15th and 16th Central Committee of the Chinese Communist Party.  He was a member of the Standing Committee of the 11th Chinese People's Political Consultative Conference.

Biography
He secondary studied at Hengyang No. 1 High School. In 1964, he graduated from the Renmin University of China, where he majored in the history of the Chinese Communist Party. After University, he was assigned to the Marxist-Leninist Institute and soon was transferred to the Red Flag magazine in November of that same year. During the Cultural Revolution, he became a sent-down youth and forced to work in the fields in Shijiazhuang, capital of north China's Hebei province.

Teng joined the Chinese Communist Party (CCP) in June 1965. He worked in the People's Publishing House in December 1974, the Political Research Office of the State Council in September 1975, and the Research Office of the General Office of the CCP Central Committee in August 1979. After the Reform and Opening-Up in May 1980, he successively served as associate researcher, researcher, theory team deputy leader, and dtheory team leader of the Secretariat of the Chinese Communist Party. He was leader of the Publicity Group of the Office of the Central Party Consolidation Steering Committee in November 1983 and deputy secretary-general of the Central Advisory Commission in October 1987. In October 1989, he became deputy director of the Central Policy Research Office, rising to director in August 1997.

References

1940 births
Living people
People from Changning, Hunan
Renmin University of China alumni
People's Republic of China politicians from Hunan
Chinese Communist Party politicians from Hunan
Members of the 15th Central Committee of the Chinese Communist Party
Members of the 16th Central Committee of the Chinese Communist Party
Members of the Standing Committee of the 11th Chinese People's Political Consultative Conference